Illeism is the act of referring to oneself in the third person instead of first person. It is sometimes used in literature as a stylistic device. In real-life usage, illeism can reflect a number of different stylistic intentions or involuntary circumstances. The term Illeism comes from Latin ille meaning "he, that".

In literature
Early literature such as Julius Caesar's Commentarii de Bello Gallico or Xenophon's Anabasis, both ostensibly non-fictional accounts of wars led by their authors, used illeism to impart an air of objective impartiality, which included justifications of the author's actions. In this way personal bias is presented, albeit dishonestly, as objectivity.

In an essay, theologian Richard B. Hays challenged earlier findings that he disagrees with: "These were the findings of one Richard B. Hays, and the newer essay treats the earlier work and earlier author at arms' length."

Illeism may also be used to show idiocy, as with the character Mongo in Blazing Saddles, e.g. "Mongo like candy" and "Mongo only pawn in game of life"; though it may also show innocent simplicity, as it does with Harry Potter's Dobby the Elf ("Dobby has come to protect, even if he does have to shut his ears in the oven door").  The childlike Sesame Street character Elmo almost exclusively speaks in the third person.

In the Babylonian Talmud and related texts, illeism is used extensively, often taking the form of the speaker utilizing the expression hahu gavra ("that man") when referring to himself.

In everyday speech
In different contexts, illeism can be used to reinforce self-promotion, as used to sometimes comic effect by Bob Dole throughout his political career ("When the president is ready to deploy, Bob Dole is ready to lead the fight on the Senate Floor", Bob Dole speaking about the Strategic Defense Initiative at the NCPAC convention, 1987). This was particularly made notable during the United States presidential election of 1996 and lampooned broadly in popular media for years afterwards. Deepanjana Pal of Firstpost noted that speaking in the third person "is a classic technique used by generations of Bollywood scriptwriters to establish a character's aristocracy, power and gravitas".

On the other hand, third person self-referral can be associated with self-deprecation, irony, and not taking oneself too seriously (since the excessive use of pronoun "I" is often seen as a sign of narcissism and egocentrism), as well as with eccentricity in general. Psychological studies show that thinking and speaking of oneself in the third person increases wisdom and has a positive effect on one's mental state because an individual who does so is more intellectually humble, more capable of empathy and understanding the perspectives of others, and is able to distance emotionally from one's own problems.

Accordingly, in certain Eastern religions, like Hinduism, illeism is sometimes seen as a sign of enlightenment, since through it, an individual detaches their eternal self (atman) from their bodily form; in particular, Jnana yoga encourages its practitioners to refer to themselves in the third person. Known illeists of that sort include Swami Ramdas, Ma Yoga Laxmi, Anandamayi Ma, and Mata Amritanandamayi.

A number of celebrities, including Marilyn Monroe, Alice Cooper, and Deanna Durbin, referred to themselves in the third person to distance their public persona from their actual self. Mary Jane Blige, in her song "Family Affair" uses herself in third person.

Some parents use illeism (refer to themselves as "Daddy" or "Mommy") because very young children may not yet understand that the pronouns "I" and "you" refer to different people based on context. Toddlers acquiring speech often refer to themselves in third person before learning proper usage of the pronoun "I", and their speech evolves past using illeism once they develop a strong sense of self-recognition, often before age two.

Notable illeists

Real people

Politics
 Julius Caesar's Commentarii de Bello Gallico (58–49 BC) present the author's exploits in the Gallic War in the third person.
 Henry Adams (1838–1918), historian, author and descendant of presidents John Adams and John Quincy Adams, throughout his autobiography The Education of Henry Adams (1918)
 General Douglas MacArthur (1880–1964) was known to refer to himself as "MacArthur" in telling stories involving himself
 Charles de Gaulle (1890–1970), president of France
 Richard Nixon (1913–94), 37th president of the United States
 Bob Dole (1923–2021), during his United States presidential campaign in 1996
 Mikhail Gorbachev (1931–2022), Russian politician, last president of the USSR
 Paulo Maluf (born 1931), Brazilian politician
 Bernie Sanders (born 1941) used third person in his presidential campaign in 2016.
 Donald Trump (born 1946), President of the United States (2017-2021)
 Silvio Berlusconi (born 1936), Italian politician, Prime minister (1994–1995; 2001–2006; 2008–2011)
 Herman Cain (1945–2020), during his United States presidential campaign in 2012
 Narendra Modi (born 1950), Prime Minister of India
 Anthony Garotinho (born 1960), Brazilian politician
Roy Kwong Chun-yu (born 1983), District Councilor and legislator of Hong Kong
Chen Shui-bian, former President of the Republic of China (Taiwan)
Leon Trotsky, following Caesar, in his History of the Russian Revolution (and sometimes in The Revolution Betrayed, where he refers to himself as "the then head of the War Department").

Sports
 After pitching Game 5 of the ALDS, Johnny Cueto (b. 1986) gave a post game interview in the third person.

 Zlatan Ibrahimović  (b. 1981), Swedish footballer
 LeBron James made several references to himself in the third person during The Decision program on ESPN in 2010.
 Rickey Henderson (b. 1958), baseball left fielder, occasionally referred to himself as "Rickey".
 Dwayne Johnson (b. 1972), professional wrestler, referenced himself in the third person as The Rock during his career, particularly with his trash-talking promos.
 Karl Malone (b. 1963), basketball player
 Diego Maradona (1960–2020), Argentinian footballer
 Lothar Matthäus (b. 1961), German football manager and former player, is quoted with the phrase: "A Lothar Matthäus does not let himself be beaten by his body. A Lothar Matthäus decides on his fate himself."
 Cam Newton (b. 1989), NFL quarterback, referred to himself in third person during his press conference at the NFL Combine in 2011.
 Pelé (1940–2022), Brazilian footballer
 Billy Davies (b. 1964), Scottish footballer and manager

Entertainment
 Alice Cooper
 Flavor Flav 
 Gina Lollobrigida
 Hedy Lamarr
 Jamie Hyneman
 Jean Harlow
 Deanna Durbin
 Marilyn Monroe
 Lila Morillo
 Mister Lobo
 Mr. T
 MF Doom (1971–2020), British-American rapper and record producer
 Noel Edmonds (b. 1948), English television presenter, radio DJ, writer, producer and businessman

Religion and spirituality
 Anandamayi Ma
 Buddha sometimes refers to himself as either, "The Buddha," or "The Tathagata."
 Sathya Sai Baba
 Mata Amritanandamayi
 Swami Ramdas (1884–1963), Indian saint, philosopher, philanthropist and pilgrim
 Rama Tirtha (1873–1906), Indian teacher of Vedanta
 Ma Yoga Laxmi, the secretary of Osho
 Jesus Christ is found referring to himself as "Jesus" (as well as the "Son of Man"), as in John 17:1–3.

Other
 Salvador Dalí in his interview with Mike Wallace, also known as The Mike Wallace Interview, on April 19, 1958.
 Norman Mailer's non-fiction work The Fight (1975) refers to the author in the third person throughout, explaining why he has chosen to do so at the beginning of the book.

Fictional characters

Books
 Major Bagstock, the apoplectic retired Indian army officer from Charles Dickens' Dombey and Son (1848) refers to himself solely as Joseph, Old Joe, Joey B, Bagstock, Josh, J.B., Anthony Bagstock, and other variants of his own name.
 Captain Hook in J. M. Barrie's Peter Pan and Wendy (1911): "'Better for Hook,' he cried, 'if he had had less ambition!' It was in his darkest hours only that he referred to himself in the third person."
 Winnetou, a Native American character in the eponymous novel by Karl May.
 Hercule Poirot, a fictional Belgian detective created by British writer Agatha Christie, usually refers to himself in the third person.
 Gollum from The Lord of the Rings (1954–55) spoke in an idiosyncratic manner, often referring to himself in the third person, and frequently talked to himself—"through having no one else to speak to", as Tolkien put it in The Hobbit.
 Charlie from the acclaimed novel Flowers for Algernon (1959) speaks in third person in the "being outside one's body and watching things happen" manner in his flashbacks to his abusive and troubled childhood suffering from phenylketonuria.
 Boday, a quirky female artist from Jack Chalker's Changewinds trilogy (1987–88).
 Y. T., a teenage girl from Snow Crash (1992) by Neal Stephenson.
 Bast the Wood Elf from The Council Wars series by John Ringo.
 The healer and wisewoman Magda Digby from the Owen Archer series (1993–2019) by Candace Robb.
 Jaqen H'ghar, an assassin of the Faceless Men in the fantasy suite A Song of Ice and Fire (1996–), consistently refers to himself ("a man") and sometimes the person he is addressing (i.e. "a girl") in third person.
 Dobby the Elf in the Harry Potter series (1997–2007).
 Ramona, the housekeeper and mentor in Silver Ravenwolf's Witches Chillers series (2000–01).
 The old man Nakata from Haruki Murakami's Kafka on the Shore (2002).
 Tigger in the Winnie the Pooh books, films and television series frequently refers to himself in the third-person plural, e.g. "That's what Tiggers do best!"

Comics 
 Doctor Doom is known for more often than not referring to himself as "Doom" instead of "me" or "I".
 The Hulk
 Mantis almost always refers to herself as "Mantis", "she", and "this one"; this has to do with her upbringing at the Temple of the Priests of Pama, an alien pacifistic sect heavily inspired by real-life Eastern religious movements.

Television
Elmo from Sesame Street (1980–present), whose speech is intended to mimic the speech of preschoolers.
Brian "Bomber" Busbridge, played by Pat Roach, in Auf Wiedersehen, Pet (1983–2004)
Disco Stu and Duffman from The Simpsons (1989–present).
Bryan Strauchan (a character portrayed by Peter Helliar)
Yoshi in Super Mario World (1991)
Jimmy from the episode "The Jimmy" (1995) of Seinfeld (1989–98), whose usage leads to confusion about his identity. The usage rubs off on George Costanza, who exclaims "George is getting upset!"
Bob, played by Saverio Guerra, in Becker (1998–2004)
Rolf from Cartoon Network animated series Ed, Edd n Eddy (1999–2009).
Stick-up man Omar Little from The Wire (2002–08). Examples include "Omar don't scare" and "Omar listening".
Numbuh 5 from the Cartoon Network animated series Codename: Kids Next Door (2002–08).
Eddie Alvarez from The Unusuals (2009)
Kenny Powers, from the television show Eastbound & Down (2009–13)
George Remus, a recurring character played by Glenn Fleshler, in Boardwalk Empire (2010–14)
The Great and Powerful Trixie Lulamoon from the animated series My Little Pony: Friendship is Magic (2010–19)
Lavon Hayes, the mayor from Hart of Dixie (2011–15).
Lieutenant Terry Jeffords from Brooklyn Nine-Nine (2013–21)
Ice Bear from the animated series We Bare Bears (2015–20)

Film
 Mr. Miyagi from The Karate Kid (1984) sometimes refers to himself as "Miyagi".
 Magua from The Last of the Mohicans (1992)
 Dwight, from Fast & Furious (2009)
 Francesco Bernoulli, from Cars 2 (2011)
 Sid from Children of Men (2006)

Manga and anime
 Sayuri Kurata from Kanon (1999–2000) speaks this way in order to separate herself from her past treatment of her little brother, which she regrets.
 Megumi Noda, aka Nodame, the title character from Nodame Cantabile (2001–09)
 Rika Shiguma from Haganai (2010–15)
 Juvia Lockser from Fairy Tail (2006–17)

Video games 
Candice, the seventh Gym Leader in the Sinnoh region in Pokémon Diamond & Pearl, often uses illeism in her speech, such as "Candice is on fire!"
Lyle in Animal Crossing
Wiggler in Paper Mario: Sticker Star
Gonta Gokuhara in Danganronpa V3: Killing Harmony
Guzma, the leader of Team Skull in Pokémon Sun & Moon, speaks like this; notable examples are "It's ya boy Guzma!" and "Guzmaaaaaaaaaaaaa! What's wrong with you?!"
The Khajiit, a race of humanoid cats in The Elder Scrolls, often refer to themselves in the third person, whether by name, or by saying 'this one' or 'Khajiit'.
The Hanar, a race of sentient jellyfish in Mass Effect, refer to themselves as 'this one'. In their culture, it is narcissistic and rude to refer to oneself as 'I'.
Paimon and Cloud Retainer in Genshin Impact
Sora Harukawa in Ensemble Stars!
Count Bleck in Super Paper Mario
Fernando Martinez from the Grand Theft Auto series addresses himself in both first and third-person.
Slackjaw in Dishonored

Podcasts 
Jabari "The Safari" Hightower (played by Lou Wilson) in Not Another D&D Podcast

See also
 Royal we
 Nosism

References

Narrative techniques
Speech